Harold Anderson may refer to:
Harold Anderson (basketball) (1902–1967), college men's basketball coach
Harold Homer Anderson (1897–1990), American research professor of psychology
Harold C. Anderson, American accountant and wilderness activist
Hal Anderson (baseball) (1904–1974), baseball player
Harold Anderson, character in 15 Maiden Lane
Harold Anderson (illustrator) (1892–1973), American illustrator
Harold David Anderson (1923–2020), Australian public servant and diplomat

See also
Harry Anderson (disambiguation)